James Madison Gaylord (May 29, 1811 – June 14, 1874) was a U.S. Representative from Ohio for one term from 1851 to 1853.

Biography 
Born in Zanesville, Ohio, Gaylord moved to McConnelsville, Ohio, in 1818.
He attended the common schools and the Ohio University at Athens.
He studied law.
He was admitted to the bar and practiced.
He was appointed clerk of the court of common pleas in 1834.

Gaylord was elected as a Democrat to the Thirty-second Congress (March 4, 1851 – March 3, 1853).
At the expiration of his term in Congress he was elected probate judge.
He was appointed deputy United States marshal in 1860.

Gaylord was elected Justice of the Peace in 1865, and by successive reelections was continued in that office until his death in McConnelsville, Ohio, June 14, 1874.
He was interred in McConnelsville Cemetery.

Sources

1811 births
1874 deaths
Politicians from Zanesville, Ohio
People from McConnelsville, Ohio
Ohio University alumni
Ohio lawyers
United States Marshals
Democratic Party members of the United States House of Representatives from Ohio
19th-century American politicians
19th-century American lawyers